There have been two baronetcies created for members of the Codrington family, one in the Baronetage of Great Britain and one in the Baronetage of the United Kingdom. The family was for a long time connected with Dodington Park.

The Codrington baronetcy, of Dodington in the County of Gloucester, was created in the Baronetage of Great Britain on 21 April 1721 for William Codrington, the first cousin and heir of Christopher Codrington, owner of large plantations in the West Indies. He later represented Minehead in the House of Commons. The second Baronet sat as a Member of Parliament for Beverley and Tewkesbury. He disinherited his son, Sir William, the third Baronet, and bequeathed his estates to his nephew Christopher Bethell-Codrington (1764–1843), the eldest son of his brother Edward Codrington, fourth son of the first Baronet.  Bethell-Codrington also became a Member of Parliament for Tewkesbury.

Among other members of the Codrington family who have gained distinction are Christopher Codrington (died 1698), uncle of the first Baronet, who was Governor of the Leeward Islands and made the family fortune; Sir Edward Codrington, son of Edward Codrington, younger brother of Christopher Bethell-Codrington, who was an admiral in the Royal Navy and a hero of the Battle of Trafalgar; his elder son Sir William Codrington, who was a lieutenant-general in the Army and represented Greenwich in the House of Commons; and his younger son, Sir Henry Codrington, who became an admiral of the fleet.

The Codrington baronetcy, of Dodington in the County of Gloucester, was created in the Baronetage of the United Kingdom on 25 February 1876 for Gerald Codrington, a grandson of the Christopher Bethell-Codrington mentioned above. His father, Sir Christopher William Codrington (1805–1864), also served as a Member of Parliament for East Gloucestershire from 1834 to 1864, and married a daughter of the 7th Duke of Beaufort, another substantial landowner in the county.

Codrington baronets, of Dodington (1721)
Sir William Codrington, 1st Baronet (died 1738)
Sir William Codrington, 2nd Baronet (1719–1792)
Sir William Codrington, 3rd Baronet (–1816)
Sir William Raimond Codrington, 4th Baronet (1805–1873)
Sir William Mary Joseph Codrington, 5th Baronet (1829–1904)
Sir William Robert Codrington, 6th Baronet (1867–1932)
Sir William Richard Codrington, 7th Baronet (1904–1961)
Sir William Alexander Codrington, 8th Baronet (1934–2006)
Sir Giles Peter Codrington, 9th Baronet (born 1943)

The heir apparent to the baronetcy is Christopher Harry Codrington (born 1988), eldest son of the 9th Baronet.

Codrington baronets, of Dodington (1876)
Sir Gerald William Henry Codrington, 1st Baronet (1850–1929)
Sir Christopher William Gerald Henry Codrington, 2nd Baronet (1894–1979)
Sir Simon Francis Bethell Codrington, 3rd Baronet (1923–2005)
Sir Christopher George Wayne Codrington, 4th Baronet (born 1960)

The heir apparent to the baronetcy is William George Bethell Codrington (born 2003)

References

Sources
https://www.bbc.co.uk/news/uk-england-oxfordshire-10852168
Kidd, Charles, Williamson, David (editors). Debrett's Peerage and Baronetage (1990 edition). New York: St Martin's Press, 1990.

Baronetcies in the Baronetage of Great Britain
Baronetcies in the Baronetage of the United Kingdom
1721 establishments in Great Britain
1876 establishments in the United Kingdom
Codrington family